The 1985 season of the Chinese Taipei National Football League.

League table

References
Results on RSSSF

1983
1
Taipei
Taipei